Huallanca (hispanicized spelling) or Wallanka (Quechua for "mountain range" and a cactus plant (Opuntia subulata)) is a district of the Bolognesi Province in the Ancash Region of Peru.

Geography 
The Wallanka mountain range mountain range traverses the district. Some of the highest mountains of the district are listed below:

See also 
 Ninaqucha
 Pampaqucha
 Suyruqucha

References 

Districts of the Bolognesi Province
Districts of the Ancash Region